Leongatha  is a town in the foothills of the Strzelecki Ranges, South Gippsland Shire, Victoria, Australia, located  south-east of Melbourne.

Canadian dairy company Saputo which trades in Australia under the Devondale label, among others, has a dairy processing plant on the north side of the town producing milk-based products for Australian and overseas markets.

History
First settlement of the area by Europeans occurred in 1845. The Post Office opened as Koorooman on 1 October 1887 and renamed Leongatha in 1891 when a township was established on the arrival of the railway.

The railway line from Melbourne reached the town in 1891, and stimulated further settlement. Regular V/Line passenger operations on the line to the local railway station ceased in 1993.

The Leongatha Magistrates' Court closed on 1 January 1990.

Transport

The town is located on the South Gippsland Highway which links Leongatha to Melbourne. Leongatha was formerly situated along the South Gippsland railway corridor that operated to its terminus at Yarram in the early 1980s and Leongatha in the mid 1990s. A V/Line road coach service replaced the rail service on 24 July 1993, running between Melbourne and Yarram. 

A second service runs from Traralgon to Wonthaggi. There was also a third bus service running from Venus Bay, through Tarwin Lower and Koonwarra connecting with the V/Line services that depart from Leongatha. This was a trial service and no longer operates.  The Leongatha Airport is located south of the town and serves general aviation.

Education
Leongatha is a major educational hub for South Gippsland, and contains several schools, including:

 Leongatha Secondary College, result of a merger between Leongatha Technical School and Leongatha High School.
 Leongatha Primary School
 South Gippsland Specialist School
 GippsTafe (Leongatha Campus)
 St Laurence O'Toole Catholic Primary School
 Mary MacKillop Catholic Regional College
 Chairo Christian School - For prep level to year 10. Also provides three to four year-old Kindergarten.

The town also has two kindergartens (Allora and Hasset Street), and two childcare centres (Brown Street and Leongatha Children's), which both have kindergarten rooms.

Tourism
 The Daffodil Festival is held annually in September. Competitions are held and many daffodil varieties are on display. A garden competition is also held.
 The railway line from Leongatha to Foster has been converted into the Great Southern Rail Trail, for the shared use of horse riding, walking and cycling.
The Great Southern Rail Trail is in the process of procuring finance to extend the trail as far as Yarram. At the present time the Wellington Shire have financed the first portion of the trail from Yarram to Alberton with the present Committee of Management intending to manage that portion in the foreseeable future. The Rail Trail commences at the end of Parr Street with a car park planned for the future to assist with access to the trail. Walkers can access the trail from the children's park next to the old rail bridge in Leongatha at the end of Bair Street, or by parking anywhere along Greenwood Parade.

Community 
Leongatha has a community theatre company, the "Lyric Theatre Company" that regularly stages theatrical productions.  The town has a medieval society, the "Leongatha Medieval Society", which re-enacts 14th-century weapons, armour and fighting styles. The Medieval Society can be seen each month at Coal Creek Community Park and Museum at Korumburra.

Leongatha offers a range of sports including: athletics, basketball, badminton, cricket, croquet, cycling (BMX, road and track), equestrian, football (Australian rules, association and indoor soccer), golf, gymnastics, hockey (field and underwater), lawn bowls, martial arts (karate and taekwondo), netball, shooting, skateboarding, softball, squash, swimming, table tennis, tennis, and volleyball (indoor and beach). The town's Australian Rules football club, the Leongatha Football Club ("The Parrots"), competes in the Gippsland Football League. Golfers play at the course of the Leongatha Golf Club on Inverloch-Koonwarra Road, Leongatha South, or at the course of the Woorayl Golf Club at the Recreation Reserve.

Community services include CFA, SES, Police, ambulance.  Other community organisations include Scouts (cubs, scouts, venturers and rovers), Girl Guides, and Salvation Army Youth Corps. The town also boasts a large YMCA complex (including pool, gym and basketball courts) plus a four theatre complex.

Notable people
 Eleanor Patterson, Australian Olympic athlete who competes in high jump and has set national records.
 Jarryd Roughead, Australian rules footballer with the Hawthorn Football Club and part owner of McCartins Hotel.
 Dyson Heppell, Australian rules footballer with the Essendon Football Club and is the captain.
 Roc Kirby, businessman who founded the Village Roadshow cinema chain and film production company.
 Lennie Gwyther - 9 year old boy who traveled more than 1000 km on horseback to see the opening of the Sydney Harbour Bridge in 1932.

See also

 Leongatha railway station

References

External links
 Leongatha Community Website

Leongatha, Victoria
Towns in Victoria (Australia)
Shire of South Gippsland